"Please Don't Go" is a song by Germany-based pop band No Mercy, released on 21 January 1997 as the fourth single from their debut album, My Promise (1997). It became a worldwide hit, entering the top 10 in Austria, the Netherlands, Spain, and the United Kingdom. The song is written by Peter Bischof, Marty Cintron, Mary Applegate and Frank Farian (under his given name Franz Reuther).

Composition

"Please Don't Go" is a dance track with a Spanish guitar constantly playing in the background.

Critical reception
Alan Jones from Music Week commented, "The dance beat, the balearic guitar work, the Gregorian backing vocals — it has to be No Mercy's Where Do You Go, but it's not. It's their identikit follow-up Please Don't Go, which includes all the elements of their long-running debut hit bolted on to a tune which doesn't quite measure up."

Music video
The music video for "Please Don't Go" was directed by Hannes Rossacher and premiered in March 1997. It features the group in a recording studio recording the track. Rossacher also directed the video for "Where Do You Go".

Track listings
 CD single
 "Please Don't Go"	- 4:00
 "Do You Want Me" - 4:12

 European CD maxi
 "Please Don't Go" (Radio Edit) – 4:14
 "Please Don't Go" (Spanish Version) – 4:14
 "Please Don't Go" (Ocean Drive Mix) – 5:44
 "Please Don't Go" (Berman Bros Club Mix) – 5:15
 "Please Don't Go" (Spike Pop Mix) – 5:02
 "Please Don't Go" (Trip House Mix) – 5:07
 "Please Don't Go" (Spike Club Mix) - 5:16
 "Please Don't Go" (Manumission Mix) - 5:01

 12" maxi
 "Please Don't Go" (Berman Brothers Club Mix) – 6:56
 "Please Don't Go" (Darrin Friedman Spike Anthem) – 9:29
 "Please Don't Go" (Vission & Lorimer Voyage Club Mix) – 7:03
 "Please Don't Go" (Spanish Remix) – 4:15
 "Please Don't Go" (Ocean Drive Mix)

Charts

Weekly charts

Year-end charts

Release history

References

1997 singles
1997 songs
Arista Records singles
Bertelsmann Music Group singles
No Mercy (pop band) songs
Song recordings produced by Frank Farian
Songs with lyrics by Mary Susan Applegate
Songs written by Frank Farian
Songs written by Peter Bischof-Fallenstein